Clear Creek County is a county located in the U.S. state of Colorado. As of the 2020 census, the population was 9,397. The county seat is Georgetown.

Clear Creek County is part of the Denver metropolitan area.

History

Clear Creek County was one of the original 17 counties created by the Colorado legislature on 1 November 1861, and is one of only two counties (along with Gilpin) to have persisted with its original boundaries unchanged. It was named after Clear Creek, which runs down from the continental divide through the county. Idaho Springs was originally designated the county seat, but the county government was moved to Georgetown in 1867.

Geography

Adjacent counties
 Jefferson - east
 Gilpin - northeast
 Park - south
 Summit - west
 Grand - northwest

Major highways
  Interstate 70
  U.S. Highway 6
  U.S. Highway 40
  State Highway 5
  State Highway 103
 Central City Parkway

National protected areas
Pike National Forest
Roosevelt National Forest
James Peak Wilderness
Mount Evans Wilderness

Scenic trails and byways
American Discovery Trail
Continental Divide National Scenic Trail
Grays Peak National Recreation Trail
Mount Evans National Recreation Trail
Guanella Pass Scenic Byway
Mount Evans Scenic Byway

Politics
Throughout its history, Clear Creek County tended to be somewhat divided between Republicans and Democrats, but has reliably voted Democratic in recent elections, with George W. Bush having been the most recent Republican to win the county, in 2000, while his father, George H. W. Bush, was the last Republican to win the narrow majority of the county's votes, in 1988. During the 2016 presidential election, Hillary Clinton became the first Democrat since her husband in 1996 to not win the majority of the county's vote, while still winning the county by a plurality.

Demographics

At the 2000 census there were 9,322 people, 4,019 households, and 2,608 families living in the county. The population density was 24 people per square mile (9/km2). There were 5,128 housing units at an average density of 13 per square mile (5/km2). The racial makeup of the county was 96.37% White, 0.28% Black or African American, 0.73% Native American, 0.36% Asian, 0.03% Pacific Islander, 1.02% from other races, and 1.20% from two or more races. 3.87% of the population were Hispanic or Latino of any race.
Of the 4,019 households 28.20% had children under the age of 18 living with them, 54.60% were married couples living together, 6.90% had a female householder with no husband present, and 35.10% were non-families. 27.20% of households were one person and 4.30% were one person aged 65 or older. The average household size was 2.31 and the average family size was 2.81.

The age distribution was 22.60% under the age of 18, 5.60% from 18 to 24, 32.60% from 25 to 44, 32.20% from 45 to 64, and 7.10% 65 or older. The median age was 40 years. For every 100 females, there were 108.80 males. For every 100 females age 18 and over, there were 110.20 males.

The median household income was $50,997 and the median family income was $61,400. Males had a median income of $41,667 versus $30,757 for females. The per capita income for the county was $28,160. About 3.00% of families and 5.40% of the population were below the poverty line, including 6.80% of those under age 18 and 5.60% of those age 65 or over.

Communities

City
 Central City (partially)
 Idaho Springs

Towns
 Empire
 Georgetown
 Silver Plume

Census-designated places

 Blue Valley
 Brook Forest (partially)

 Downieville-Lawson-Dumont
 Echo Hills
 Floyd Hill
 Pine Valley
 St. Mary's
 Upper Bear Creek
 Upper Witter Gulch

Ghost towns
 Bakerville
 Silver Creek

Historic areas
 Georgetown Loop Historic Mining & Railroad Park
 Georgetown–Silver Plume National Historic District

Ski areas 

 Echo Mountain 
 Loveland
 Otter Mountain

See also

Outline of Colorado
Index of Colorado-related articles
Arapahoe County, Kansas Territory
Montana County, Jefferson Territory
Colorado census statistical areas
Denver-Aurora-Boulder Combined Statistical Area
Front Range Urban Corridor
National Register of Historic Places listings in Clear Creek County, Colorado

References

External links

Clear Creek County Colorado tourism and visitors site
Colorado Historical Society

 

 
Colorado counties
1861 establishments in Colorado Territory
Populated places established in 1861